Carlos Alberto Tejada Noriega (born 11 November 1956 in Lima, Peru) is a former Peruvian Minister of Health between 2011 and 2012. He was also a urologist and later a football referee.

Football career
He refereed three matches in the FIFA World Cup, two in 1994 and one in 1998.

In 2010, he ran against Manuel Burga to head the Peruvian Football Federation.

Political career
He was the mayor of San Borja District (2003–2006 and 2007-2010). He was the Peruvian Minister of Health during the presidency of Ollanta Humala, between July 28, 2011 and July 23, 2012. He was elected mayor of San Borja for a their term (2019-2022) with Popular Action (Peru)

References

External links 
 
 
 

1956 births
FIFA World Cup referees
Peruvian football referees
Peruvian urologists
Peruvian people of Spanish descent
Living people
People from Lima
Copa América referees
1994 FIFA World Cup referees
1998 FIFA World Cup referees
Peruvian Ministers of Health
Mayors of places in Peru
Federico Villarreal National University alumni
National University of San Marcos alumni